Moravian University is a private university in Bethlehem, Pennsylvania. The institution traces its founding to 1742 by Moravians, descendants of followers of the Bohemian Reformation under John Amos Comenius. Founded in 1742, Moravian University is the sixth-oldest college in the United States.

History
Moravian University is the sixth-oldest college in the United States and the first to open its doors to women. It traces its roots to the Bethlehem Female Seminary, which was founded in 1742, as the first boarding school for young women in the U.S. The seminary was created by Benigna, Countess von Zinzendorf, the daughter of Count Nikolaus Ludwig Zinzendorf, who was the benefactor of the fledgling Moravian communities in Nazareth and Bethlehem, Pennsylvania. The Female Seminary was incorporated by the Pennsylvania State Legislature in 1863 and became the women's college, the Moravian Seminary and College for Women in 1913.

The university also traces its roots to the founding of two boys' schools, established in 1742 and 1743, which merged to become Nazareth Hall in 1759. Located in the town of Nazareth, Nazareth Hall became, in part, Moravian College and Theological Seminary in 1807. It was later incorporated by the Pennsylvania State Legislature as Moravian College and Theological Seminary in 1863 as a baccalaureate-granting institution. Beginning in 1858 and continuing to 1892, the seminary and college relocated from Nazareth to a former boys' school on Church Street in Bethlehem, located on the present site of the Bethlehem City Hall.

The men's Moravian College and Theological Seminary then settled in the north end of the city (the present-day North Campus) as a result of a donation from the Bethlehem Congregation of the Moravian Church in 1888. The first buildings constructed at North Campus, Comenius Hall and Zinzendorf Hall, were completed in 1892 and joined the property's original brick farmhouse to form the new campus. The farmhouse was later named Hamilton Hall, which still stands today.

In 1954, the two schools combined to form the single, coeducational, modern institution of Moravian College. The merger of the two institutions combined the North Campus (the location of the men's college from 1892 to 1954) and the South Campus (the location of the women's college) into a single collegiate campus. The distance between the North and South campuses is about 0.8 miles of Main Street, called the "Moravian Mile". First-year students traditionally walk the Moravian Mile as part of their orientation activities.

In 2021, Moravian College received approval from the Pennsylvania Department of Education to become a university. The change to Moravian University became official on July 1, 2021.

Academics

Moravian University currently enrolls about 1,700 full-time undergraduate students in a wide variety of majors, all of which are presented in the liberal arts tradition. The seminary enrolls over 100 part-time students in its graduate divinity programs. During most semesters, at least 14 denominations are represented in the seminary student body. Faith communities most often represented among the seminary's students include: Moravian, Lutheran, UCC, Episcopal, United Methodist, Presbyterian, Baptist, Roman Catholic, Quaker, Mennonite, Unitarian Universalist, African Methodist Episcopal, Assembly of God, Brethren, Reformed, and nondenominational. The university's varied and highly regarded music programs grow from the Moravian Church's musical traditions.

Moravian University's student news site is The Comenian, which is published online throughout the school year.

Every year, the student body elects representatives to the United Student Government. USG has a legislature, composed of 16 senators from the undergraduate body, an executive, including an elected president and vice president, appointed cabinet and staff, and a judiciary, composed of appointed justices. USG was officially recognized in 1968. Additionally, two students are elected members of Moravian University's board of trustees; both are full, voting members and serve two-year terms.

Moravian University awards these undergraduate and graduate degrees: Bachelor of Music, Bachelor of Arts, Bachelor of Fine Arts, Bachelor of Science in Nursing, Bachelor of Science, Master of Business Administration, Master of Education, Master of Arts in Teaching, Master of Business Administration, Master of Data Analytics, Master of Health Administration, Master of Human Resource Management, Master of Fine Arts, Master of Arts in Clinical Counseling, and six Master of Science programs in nursing; master of science in athletic training, master of science in occupational therapy, master of arts in speech-language pathology, doctor of physical therapy, and doctor of athletic training. The seminary grants Master of Divinity, Master of Arts in Chaplaincy, and Master of Arts in Theological Studies degrees. The university also has evening undergraduate programs for adults seeking continuing undergraduate education and graduate degrees. The seminary has accreditation from the Association of Theological Schools in the United States and Canada.

Because Bethlehem, Pennsylvania, and Tondabayashi, Japan, have been sister cities for over half a century, Moravian University and Osaka Ohtani University (大阪大谷大学) also established a partnership. Each spring, several Japanese students come to Moravian for two weeks to take a class about the American education system. These students are hosted by Moravian students and enjoy trips to New York City and Philadelphia. During May and June 2010, the first two Moravian students studied at Osaka Ohtani University. Additionally, the university is a member of the Lehigh Valley Association of Independent Colleges & Universities; members include Muhlenberg College, Lafayette College, Lehigh University, Cedar Crest College, and DeSales University; students from each institution can take classes in each other member institution and can take courses in programs offered at other institutions not offered at Moravian, such as architecture.

The university's Student Opportunities for Academic Research (SOAR) program provides stipends, travel allowances, and expenses for students engaged in research or creative activities through close interaction with a faculty mentor. The program helps Moravian students gain a better understanding of scholarship in their discipline, and fosters scholar–colleague relationships. SOAR stipends can be as high as $3,000 for summer work.

Established in 1960, the university's honors program provides qualified seniors the opportunity to pursue a yearlong intensive study of a subject of special interest.

Campus
The university's programs are offered at four locations: Main Street Campus (North Campus), the Priscilla Payne Hurd Campus (South Campus), the Steel Field Complex, and the Sports Medicine and Rehabilitation Center.

Priscilla Payne Hurd Campus
Art and music programs are offered in Bethlehem's historic district on the college's Priscilla Payne Hurd Campus. Many of the buildings on that campus were built during the colonial period, including the Brethren's House, built in 1748, which served as a hospital during the Revolutionary War, and currently houses the Music Department. Also located on Priscilla Payne Campus are the President's House, Main Hall (1854), the Widow's House, Clewell Hall, West Hall, South Hall, the 1867 Chapel, Clewell Dining Hall, and the Central Moravian Church. A number of the buildings are connected. The facilities have been renovated to include Payne Gallery (renovated from the original women's gymnasium in 1903), the college's two-level art gallery that offers several shows each year, and Foy Concert Hall. Also located on the Priscilla Payne Hurd Campus are Peter Hall, a medium-sized recital hall, Hearst Hall, a small recital hall, and individual student rehearsal rooms and art studios. The university presents the nationally renowned Christmas Vespers services in the Central Moravian Church, located on the corner of Main and Church streets across from Brethren's House. Many of the buildings on the Priscilla Payne Hurd Campus are located in a National Register of Historic Places District and Church Street has been referred to as one of the most historic streets in America.

In the 2009–2010 school year, Moravian University added a new living complex on the Priscilla Payne Hurd Campus called the HILL. Each floor has suites, where four to 16 people can live. The complex has classrooms, a cafe, a fitness room, a mail room, and common rooms. The HILL is air conditioned and fully handicap accessible. The suites contain a living room, full kitchen, private bathroom, and additional hallway sinks. A shuttle service is provided for easy transportation between the North and South campuses.

Main Street Campus
Initially given in 1888 and settled in 1892, the North Campus is also known as the Main Street campus, as it is physically larger and is the site of the majority of the university's buildings, academic departments, administration, and student residences. The main building of the Main Street Campus is Comenius Hall, which was built in 1892 and is named for John Amos Comenius, the last bishop of Unity of the Brethren, known as the "father of modern education" for his revolutionary educational principles. Comenius wrote in 1632, "not the children of the rich or of the powerful only, but of all alike, boys and girls, both noble and ignoble, rich and poor, in all cities and towns, villages and hamlets, should be sent to school". The Moravians had considered schools secondary in importance only to churches. A statue of Comenius, which was a gift to the college from Charles University of Prague and the Moravian Church of Czechoslovakia, stands in front of Comenius Hall. The Main Street Campus is also the location of Reeves Library, Priscilla Payne Hurd Academic Complex, Colonial Hall, the Bahnson Center, the Moravian Archives, Zinzendorf Hall, Borhek Chapel, Prosser Auditorium (capacity 300, inside the Haupert Union Building), Monocacy Hall, Collier Hall of Science, the Sally Miksiewiecz Center for Health Sciences, Hamilton Hall, Memorial Hall, Benigna Hall, Johnston Hall (capacity 1,600 for athletics, 3,000 for events), the Timothy M. Breidegam Athletic and Recreation Center, the Collier Hall of Science, the Haupert Union Building, the Arena Theatre, and most of the university's student housing, including dorms, townhouses, and apartments.

In 2016, John Makuvek Field was installed and opened behind the Haupert Union Building. John Makuvek Field is a synthetic-turf field that is home to the Greyhounds' field hockey, men's and women's lacrosse, and men's and women's soccer teams. The field is named for John Makuvek, who retired in 1996 after four years as athletics director, and in 2010 after 43 years as head golf coach. The field is located at the center of campus, with views from the residential halls, Reeves Library, and the portico of the Haupert Union Building.

In 2017, the Sally Breidegam Miksiewicz Center for Health Sciences was opened at 1107 Main Street. The 55,000-square-foot facility hosts classes for both undergraduate and graduate programs, including nursing, informatics, and the health sciences and features the region's only virtual cadaver lab. The building is named in honor of former Moravian College trustee Sally Breidegam Miksiewicz.

Also located on the Main Street Campus is the Betty Prince field hockey field.

Steel Field Complex

Most of the university's athletic fields are located at this complex, including the football stadium with a grandstand capacity of 2,400 and Sportexe turf field, eight-lane Mondo Super X Performance synthetic track, the softball field, the Gillespie baseball field, the Hoffman tennis courts, the football practice fields, and a fieldhouse.

Steel Field and its brick grandstand were originally built by Bethlehem Steel to host the Bethlehem Steel Football Club, 1913 to 1930. In 1925, Lehigh University purchased Steel Field from Bethlehem Steel. The Bethlehem Steel Soccer Club continued to use the field until its demise. In 1962, Lehigh sold the facility to Moravian University.

Athletics
The university is a member of the NCAA and competes in Division III sports. It is also an associate member of the Centennial Conference for football only; Centennial football members include Muhlenberg College, Dickinson College, Franklin & Marshall, Johns Hopkins University, Juniata College, Gettysburg College, Ursinus College, and McDaniel College. Moravian University is a founding member of the Landmark Conference for all sports except football; members include Elizabethtown College, Susquehanna University, Catholic University, Drew University, Goucher College, Juniata College, and the University of Scranton. Golf competes in the Empire 8 Conference.

Men's sports include football, lacrosse, soccer, basketball, baseball, track and field, cross country, tennis, golf, and swimming. Women's sports include softball, basketball, soccer, field hockey, track and field, volleyball, tennis, lacrosse, golf (beginning in 2023–24), cross country, and swimming.

Notable people

Alumni
 J. Neil Alexander, Bishop of the Episcopal Diocese of Atlanta
 John Andretti, former NASCAR, IndyCar, and NHRA professional race car driver
 William F. Badè, former president of the Sierra Club, 1918–22
 James Montgomery Beck, class of 1880 and trustee; Solicitor General of the United States (1921–1925), member of United States House of Representatives (1927–1934), and constitutional law scholar
 John B. Callahan, mayor of Bethlehem, Pennsylvania, 2004–14
 Rev. Edmund Alexander de Schweinitz, class of 1834, Bishop of the Moravian Church; author and founder of The Moravian, the weekly journal of the Moravian Church
 Robert L. Freeman, member of the Pennsylvania House of Representatives from the 136th district
 John Gorka, contemporary folk musician
 Louis Greenwald, New Jersey State Assemblyman
 William Jacob Holland, zoologist and paleontologist; University of Pittsburgh chancellor, 1891–1901; former director of the Carnegie Museums of Pittsburgh
 George Hrab, class of 1993, musician and podcaster
 Andrew A. Humphreys, class of 1822, brigadier general in the U.S. Army; Union general in the Civil War; division commander, Army of the Potomac; chief engineer of the U.S. Army; one of the principal incorporators of the National Academy of Sciences; author of scientific and historical works
 William D. Hutchinson, justice, Pennsylvania Supreme Court, 1982–87; judge, United States Court of Appeals for the Third Circuit, 1987–95
 Janine Jagger, Class of 1972, professor of medicine, MacArthur Fellow
 Florence Foster Jenkins, class of 1881, American socialite and amateur operatic soprano
 Bobby Levine, American jazz saxophonist
 John Baillie McIntosh, class of 1837, major general in the U.S. Army; Union officer in the Civil War; commander in the Battle of Gettysburg; superintendent of Indian affairs for California, 1869–70
 Paul Marcincin, former two time mayor of Bethlehem, Pennsylvania from 1978 to 1988 and from 1997 to 1998; creator of Musikfest
 Sandra Novack, author
 J. William Reynolds incumbent Mayor of Bethlehem, Pennsylvania
 Fred Rooney, director, Community Legal Resource Network, CUNY
 Richard Shindell, contemporary folk musician
 Denny Somach, businessman, author, and Grammy Award-winning radio producer
 Herbert Spaugh, U.S. bishop of the Moravian Church
 Edward Thebaud, class of 1816, New York industrialist and merchant; principal, Bouchard & Thebaud, 1820–26; principal, Edward Thebaud & Son, 1850–1858
 Joseph Thoder, physician, Professor of Orthopaedics and Sports Medicine at Temple University School of Medicine
 Mildred Ladner Thompson, former reporter for The Wall Street Journal and Tulsa World
 David Zinczenko, editor and publisher

Trustees
 Curtis H. Barnette, trustee; former chairman and CEO of Bethlehem Steel
 J. William Reynolds

References

External links 

 
 Moravian College Official Athletics Website

 
Bethlehem, Pennsylvania
1742 establishments in Pennsylvania
Educational institutions of the American (North) Province of the Moravian Church
Educational institutions established in 1742
Universities and colleges in Northampton County, Pennsylvania
Liberal arts colleges in Pennsylvania
Private universities and colleges in Pennsylvania